The 1915 Toronto Argonauts season was the 32nd season for the team since the franchise's inception in 1873. The team finished in second place in the Interprovincial Rugby Football Union with a 3–2 record and failed to qualify for the playoffs.

Regular season

Standings

Schedule

(*) The November 6 game won by Toronto over Ottawa was called because of darkness and protested by Ottawa. IRFU executives upheld the protest and declared the game no-contest.

References

Toronto Argonauts seasons